A rebar spacer is a device that secures the reinforcing steel or "rebar" in reinforced concrete structures as the rebar is assembled in place before the final concrete pour. The spacers are left in place for the pour to keep the reinforcing in place and become a part of the structure.

The main categories of rebar spacers are:

 Linear Spacers (Π-section profiles, H-section profiles, or other 3-dimensional shapes),

 Point Spacers (wheel spacers, various tower or chair-like shapes)

Rebar spacers can be divided into three raw materials categories:

 Concrete spacers
 Plastic spacers
 Metal spacers

The concrete spacers have the advantage of the same raw material which will improve the water tightness and strength of the concrete. Plastic spacers have the advantage of low-cost production and fast processing, but are relatively weak. Metal spacers are strong but may rust.

Function 
The engineering study of every reinforced concrete construction, whether it is a building, a bridge, a bearing wall, or another structure, dictates the positioning of steel rebars at specific positions in the volume of concrete (predicted concrete cover of steel reinforcement bars). This cover varies between 10 and 100 mm. The statics of every concrete construction is designed in such a way that steel and concrete properties are combined in order to achieve the most possible strength for the particular construction (e.g. anti-earthquake protection) as well as prevent the long-term corrosion of steel that would weaken the construction. Rebar spacers secure the correct position of steel, thus assisting in the practical application of the theoretical specifications of concrete construction. The cover of the steel of a particular construction element (for example in a concrete slab or a beam) should be generally uniform within the element.

The use of spacers is particularly important in areas with high earthquake activity in combination with corrosive environments (like proximity to the salt water of the sea), for example Japan, Iran, Greece, California, etc.

Plastic versus concrete spacers and bar supports

Plastic spacers and bar supports 

Plastic spacers and bar supports do not bond well with concrete, and are not compatible materials.  Plastic has mechanical properties (holds the bar in position) but no structural properties, and is a foreign element within the construction.

When the concrete is poured into the form, a small gap is created between it and the plastic. Plastic has a coefficient of thermal expansion and contraction 10 to 15 times that of concrete, and when subjected to temperature variations, the plastic continues to expand and contract at that higher coefficient. At high temperatures, plastic can even melt. The result is a separation between the spacers and the poured concrete, creating a free passage for corrosive agents to reach the steel reinforcement from the exterior of the concrete product. This will cause the steel – and eventually the concrete – to corrode.
 
If steam curing is applied to the concrete, the heat in the curing process causes the plastic to expand while the concrete is relatively fresh and weak. After reaching the maximum curing temperature and volume expansion of the plastic, the temperature is held at this level until the concrete reaches the desired strength. After curing, the subsequent lower temperatures cause the plastic to contract, and a gap remains at the interface between the plastic and concrete.
 
Plastic spacers are also subject to corrosion when they come into contact with chlorides and chemicals, where concrete has a much higher resistance.

Concrete spacers and bar supports 
Concrete spacers and bar supports are made of the same material as the poured concrete, so thermal expansion and contraction are equal. Because they are the same material, the concrete and spacers will bond with no gaps.
 
Concrete spacers and bar supports help maintain material integrity and uniformity of the concrete, and provide a cover over the reinforcement that protects against corrosion.

Concrete spacers with a plastic clip or other fixing mechanism 

Concrete spacers and bar supports help maintain material integrity and uniformity of the concrete and provide a cover over the reinforcement that protects against corrosion.

Concrete spacers with a plastic clip or fixing mechanism do not have a negative effect on material integrity and do not weaken the corrosion protective cover over the reinforcement.

The plastic clip or fixing mechanism is hinged from the top of the spacer and does not come into contact with the soffit of the concrete. The plastic clip or fixing mechanism is embedded only 5 mm into the spacer which maintains the material integrity at the product's surface. The plastic in the clip or fixing mechanism is used only for attaching to and holding the reinforcement, leaving the concrete part to do the work of the spacer.

Economics 

Not only do plastic spacers offer no compatibility with the materials used in civil engineering structures, but they also can only hold a fraction of the weight a concrete spacer can. As a result, more plastic spacers would need to be used to cover the same amount of reinforcement (the ratio is 1 to 2, but will increase if the weight of the rebar structure is increased, ratios of up to 3 to 1 have been observed). Consequently, there may be no real value added both or when plastic spacers are used.

References

Building engineering
Building materials
Reinforced concrete